Cisarua is a location and district in the Bogor Regency, located in the province of West Java, with a population of 127,096 in 2020. The district is known for its mild climate, tea fields, and extensive views, being located in a rather high altitude.

Near the district is a mountain pass known for its villas, hostels, as well as a well-known "heritage" hotel known as the "Puncak Pass", built in 1928.

Cisarua is also known due to the relatively high population of the Middle East and the use of Indonesian Arabic as well having a sizeable population of asylum seekers and refugees, mainly coming from Afghanistan and Pakistan, as well as ones coming from parts of Africa, mainly from Sudan, Egypt, and Somalia. The reason why many asylum seekers has sought refuge here is because of the relatively cool temperatures, as well as its location being close to the UNHCR offices in the capital Jakarta, which are located roughly about 72 kilometres north of the district.

History
Back at the Dutch colonial era, the area is called "Tjisaroea", and between 1945 and 1949 Indonesian National Revolution the Royal Netherlands East Indies Army (KNIL) maintained a prison camp for soldiers convicted of breaches of military discipline.

The most well-known of those imprisoned there was Poncke Princen, who in 1947 served four months at the Tjisaroea Prison Camp on charges of desertion and later went over to the Indonesian National Armed Forces.

Tourism 
Tourism attractions around the area include Taman Safari, Telaga Warna and Melrimba Puncak.

Cisarua also attracts many tourists from the Middle East, including from Saudi Arabia, with reasons of coming similar to the ones with the asylum seekers. Because of the number of Arab migrants and tourists, the district is often called as the "Kampung Arab".

References

External links

 Poncke Princen and other imprisoned soldiers at Tjisaroea in 1947

Defunct prisons in Indonesia
Indonesian National Revolution